Sásová is a neighborhood of Banska Bystrica, Slovakia. It became part of the city of Banska Bystrica in 1966. Currently there are approximately 20,000 inhabitants. 

The first written record is from 1350 as  Villa Militis ("Village Knight").

The population in 1910 was of 671 people, mostly Slovak inhabitants.

Banská Bystrica